Dimitris Spanos (born 13 July 1969) is a Greek professional football manager.

Managerial Statistics

References

1969 births
Living people
Footballers from Aigio
Greek football managers
Anagennisi Arta F.C. managers
Vyzas F.C. managers
Rodos F.C. managers
Panachaiki F.C. managers
Panegialios F.C. managers
Aiolikos F.C. managers
Panelefsiniakos F.C. managers
PAS Lamia 1964 managers
Apollon Smyrnis F.C. managers
Aris Thessaloniki F.C. managers
PAE Kerkyra managers
Doxa Drama F.C. managers
Levadiakos F.C. managers
Ionikos F.C. managers